Leo Dorfman (February 17, 1914 – July 9, 1974) (also credited as Geoff Brown and David George) was an American writer of comic books throughout the Silver Age. Although the majority of his work was for DC Comics, he also wrote for Dell Comics and Gold Key Comics.

Early life
Dorfman grew up on New York City's Lower East Side.

Career
Leo Dorfman began working for National Periodical Publications in the 1950s. Comics historian Mark Evanier has estimated that Dorfman may have been "the most prolific scripter" for Superman during the 1960s.

Dorfman's work included the creation of the Superman supporting character Pete Ross in 1961 as well as writing the "Superman Red/Superman Blue" story in Superman #162 (July 1963), which inspired a year-long plot arc in 1998. As the writer of Superman's Girl Friend, Lois Lane, he and artist Kurt Schaffenberger crafted Catwoman's first appearance in the Silver Age of Comic Books in issue #70 (Nov. 1966) and updated Lois Lane's fashions to a then-more contemporary look in #80 (Jan. 1968). Dorfman also modernized Jimmy Olsen, making him a more independent figure who solved crimes as "Mr. Action", with less help from Superman. Dorfman wrote World's Finest Comics #175 (May 1968) which featured Neal Adams' first Batman story. In 1971, Dorfman created the Ghosts anthology series for DC.

He produced stories for Gold Key Comics' supernaturally-themed The Twilight Zone, Ripley's Believe it or Not!, Boris Karloff Mystery and Grimm's Ghost Stories. One of Gold Key's editors at the time told Mark Evanier "Leo writes stories and then he decides whether he's going to sell them to DC [for Ghosts] or to us. He tells us that if they come out good, they go to us and if they don't, they go to DC. I assume he tells DC the opposite."

Leo Dorfman died unexpectedly on July 9, 1974 at the age of 60 while still writing for Ghosts. Editor and longtime friend Murray Boltinoff replaced Dorfman with Carl Wessler as the series' primary writer.

Bibliography

DC Comics

 Action Comics #288–289, 292–325, 327–333, 335, 337, 340, 345–346, 348–350, 354–359, 362–366, 369–372, 374–376, 379–382, 389, 393–404, 406, 411, 413, 417–418 (1962–1972)
 Adventure Comics #313, 387–388, 392, 396 (1963–1970)  
 DC Special Series #7 (1977)  
 Ghosts #1–10, 13, 17–20, 25–30, 32, 34, 36–37, 40 (1971–1975)  
 Limited Collectors' Edition #C–32 (1975)
 Secrets of Sinister House #18 (1974)
 Superboy #111, 118–119, 122–124, 132, 134, 137, 139, 146, 148, 173, 175–184, 186–192, 194, 196 (1964–1973)  
 Superman #152, 160–162, 168, 171, 173, 176–182, 185–186, 203, 210, 218–219, 221, 225–226, 228–229 (1962–1970)
 The Superman Family #164, 167, 170 (Jimmy Olsen) (1974–1975)  
 Superman's Girl Friend, Lois Lane #1, 31–32, 35–38, 40–43, 50, 53–55, 57, 61–64, 66–67, 69–71, 73–76, 78, 80–82, 84–85, 87, 89, 94, 96, 101 (1958–1970)  
 Superman's Pal Jimmy Olsen #52, 59–64, 66–69, 74–76, 78–79, 81–84, 86, 91–94, 96–98, 100, 102–103, 106, 108, 115, 119–121, 123–127, 129–130, 132, 154–163 (1961–1974)
 The Unexpected #149, 157, 170 (1973–1975) 
 The Witching Hour #36, 45 (1973–1974)  
 World's Finest Comics #160, 164, 171, 175, 183 (1966–1969)

Dell Comics
 Four Color #794, 800, 831, 910, 1173, 1288 (1957–1962)
 Lone Ranger #78 (1954)
 Roy Rogers Comics #84 (1954)
 The Twilight Zone #01860–207, #12–860–210 (1962)

Fawcett Comics
 Fawcett Movie Comic #20 (1952)
 Motion Picture Comics #105, 109–110 (1951–1952)

Gold Key Comics

 Boris Karloff Tales of Mystery #4–5 (1963)
 Boris Karloff Thriller #1  (1962)
 Doc Savage #1 (1966)
 G-8 and His Battle Aces #1 (1966)
 Gunsmoke #1 (1969)
 Judge Colt #2–4 (1970)
 Lassie #65–66 (1966)
 M.A.R.S. Patrol Total War #1–10 (1965–1969)
 Mystery Comics Digest #2, 6, 18–19, 23–24 (1972–1975)
 Ripley's Believe It or Not! #22, 25, 27 (1970–1971)
 The Twilight Zone #1–2, 5, 12, 14–18, 20 (1962–1967)
 UFO Flying Saucers #1 (1968)

References

External links
 
  on Two for the Money
 Analysis of Dorfman's work on Superboy, as compared to that of other writers
 Leo Dorfman at Mike's Amazing World of Comics

1914 births
1974 deaths
American comics writers
DC Comics people
People from the Lower East Side
Silver Age comics creators
Writers from Manhattan